The 11th Dáil was elected at the 1943 general election on 23 June 1943 and met on 1 July 1943. The members of Dáil Éireann, the house of representatives of the Oireachtas (legislature) of Ireland, are known as TDs. 

The Dáil adjourned sine die on 10 May 1944, the day after President Douglas Hyde called a general election for 30 May at the request of the Taoiseach Éamon de Valera. The 11th Dáil was dissolved on 7 June 1944. Exceptionally, the outgoing Dáil was not dissolved until after the election. Although the Constitution requires the President to dissolve the Dáil before a general election, this procedure was overridden by the General Elections (Emergency Provisions) Act 1943. The act, which would have been unconstitutional if not for the state of emergency in effect during the Second World War, was intended to increase national security by minimising the interval during which no Dáil was in existence. The 13th Dáil lasted  days.

There were no by-elections during this Dáil.

Composition of the 11th Dáil

Government party denoted with bullet

Graphical representation
This is a graphical comparison of party strengths in the 11th Dáil from July 1943. This was not the official seating plan.

Ceann Comhairle
On 1 July 1943, Frank Fahy (FF), who had served as Ceann Comhairle since 1932, was proposed by Éamon de Valera and seconded by Seán T. O'Kelly for the position, and was elected without a vote.

TDs by constituency
The list of the 138 TDs elected, is given in alphabetical order by Dáil constituency.

Changes

See also
Members of the 4th Seanad

References

External links
Houses of the Oireachtas: Debates: 11th Dáil

 
11
11th Dáil